Uchū Nippon Setagaya (Japanese: 宇宙 日本 世田谷) is the seventh and final studio album by Japanese dream pop band Fishmans, first released 24 July 1997 on Polydor. The album's title roughly translates to Space, Japan, Setagaya.

Background
After signing a deal with Polydor Records for a three-album deal, Fishmans put out Kuchu Camp and Long Season (both 1996). The band returned to their studio, Waikiki Beach, to record a third album, but the band was plagued with internal struggle. Frontman Shinji Sato would often come to rehearsals with nearly-complete home demo recordings, which alienated the other members of the band.

This would be the band's final studio album, but was followed up by two live albums, 8月の現状 (1998), and 98.12.28 男達の別れ (1999). Sato died under mysterious circumstances three months after the recording of the latter.

Track listing

Note: All tracks are presented in all caps, with the exception of tracks 3 and 6, which are in Japanese on all versions of the album. Translations for these tracks are approximate.

Personnel
Adapted from CD liner notes:

Fishmans
Shinji Sato – vocals, guitar
Yuzuru Kashiwabara – bass guitar
Motegi Kinichi – drums

Additional personnel and production
Honzi – keyboards, violin, melodica, toy piano, mandolin
Michio Sekiguchi – additional guitars
ZAK – producer, mixing, recording engineer
Yuka Koizumi – mastering engineer
Tak – recording engineer
Mei Sumita – photography

Charts

External links

References

Fishmans albums
1997 albums